Sju ord på tunnelbanan (lit. Seven Words on the Metro) is a 1972 poetry collection novel by Swedish poet Karl Vennberg. It won the Nordic Council's Literature Prize in 1972.

References

1972 poetry books
Swedish poetry collections
Nordic Council's Literature Prize-winning works
Albert Bonniers Förlag books